Lyrick Studios, formerly The Lyons Group, was an American video production and distribution company based in Allen, Texas best known for their flagship property Barney & Friends.

The company was known for producing and distributing television shows, home videos, audio products and children's books and toys. On February 9, 2001, the company was acquired by HIT Entertainment and the two companies merged in June the same year, with the logo continuing to be used until August.

History
The company traces its origins to 1988, when The Lyons Group was formed as a division of DLM, Inc., an educational company owned by Richard C. Leach. Lyons began producing and distributing a direct-to-video series titled Barney and the Backyard Gang, which was created by Leach's daughter-in-law, Sheryl Leach. Three years after its debut, Barney caught the attention of PBS executives, who subsequently revamped the concept for television as Barney & Friends and began airing on the organization's flagship television service on April 6, 1992.

Lyrick Studios was formed in 1994, and The Lyons Group became a division of a new company under the name The Lyons Partnership. The company developed the series Wishbone for PBS in 1995. This series was produced by Big Feats! Entertainment, another division of the company, and was primarily filmed on a studio backlot in Allen, Texas. In the late 1990s, Lyrick acquired the distribution rights for VeggieTales and The Wiggles and also distributed book publishing and video gaming rights for some Humongous Entertainment video game characters like Putt-Putt, Freddi Fish, and Pajama Sam. On February 9, 2001, the company was acquired by HIT Entertainment for $275 million and merged in June of that year. Though the logo would continue to appear until August. 

The home video division of the company was rebranded under the HIT Entertainment name and remained trading until 2006, when HIT shuttered the division and began to release products in the United States through outside third-parties instead.

Distribution

Programs

Movies/TV Films

Notes

References

External links
 

Mattel
Barney & Friends
Bob the Builder
VeggieTales
The Wiggles
Mass media companies established in 1988
Mass media companies disestablished in 2001
1988 establishments in Texas
2001 disestablishments in Texas
2001 mergers and acquisitions
Defunct companies based in Texas
HIT Entertainment